Alexei Vladimirovich Stanchinsky (9 March (OS) / 21 March 1888 – 25 September (OS) / 6 October 1914), was a composer from the Russian Empire.

From a young age Stanchinsky was a gifted musician, composing and performing his first works at the age of six years.  At the age of 16, he continued to develop his skills by taking lessons from music educators such as Josef Lhévinne and Konstantin Eiges for piano, and Nikolai Zhilyayev and Alexander Grechaninov for counterpoint, harmony, and composition.  At the age of 19, Stanchinsky entered the Moscow Conservatory to continue his musical studies with Taneyev and Igumnov to assist his musical growth.
Stanchinsky had always shown great promise as a musician even at a young age, but was often viewed as “unstable” and a victim of his own nerves.   This became very prominent when his father died in 1910, as Alexei became quite delusional and suffered from this state for many years.  After a brief hiatus from music, Stanchinsky returned to his roots by gathering folk tunes for a personal collection and eventually returned to the conservatory life-style by studying with his colleagues again.  However, his life would never again be what it was.  In October 1914, he was found dead next to a stream near Logachyovo after wandering the countryside.  His death is still a mystery, as details were never found or revealed about his last days.

Biography

Early life
Alexei Stanchinsky was born on 9 March 1888, in Obolsunovo, Vladimir, Russia.  At the age of six, it was apparent that he was an unusually talented musician as he was already performing piano works of the masters.  Stanchinsky and his parents moved to Logachyovo when he was 11, as a source of inspiration for his musical gift.  Logachyovo was the village made famous by Mikhail Glinka, as he spent many years there gathering folk songs. Due to his health, Stanchinsky could not live in the city comfortably, so he often commuted to Moscow for studying purposes.  Due to his illness and inability to travel at times, his lessons with Sergey Taneyev were often done by correspondence. This is one of the first recorded accounts of musical work being performed by correspondence rather than face to face.  During 1904-1907 that Stanchinsky's talents continued to grow, and he was fully accepted into the Moscow Conservatory in 1907.

Later years
While Stanchinsky was working at the Moscow Conservatory, he excelled in all facets of his studies, however after one major event all his work would come crashing down before him.  In 1908 his father died, which was the ultimate derailment for Alexei.  Not long after his father's death, Stanchinsky was diagnosed with the disease Dementia praecox, which offered him a wide variety of symptoms including hallucinations and fits of rage.  He spent the majority of 1908 in a medical clinic where despite periods of lucidity, he was eventually described as incurable and discharged. After a time, Stanchinsky once again entered the Moscow Conservatory.  It was during this time that it seemed that he was back to his normal self, as he was again composing, playing, and working with his colleagues once more.  He spent the next few years further developing his skills and his own unique sound.  During the years before his death he had moved on from traditional styles of composition and began to discover his own creative musical voice, rather than mimicking those of composers past.  After much of his work was finished and he seemed to have returned to a sense of normalcy, he was asked by his teacher Taneyev to partake in a recital along with fellow composers of his time.

The only recital that Stanchinsky ever took part in was held in Moscow Conservatory on 2 March 1914, publicizing the works of five young composers. His works were well received, and it appeared for a moment that Stanchinsky had solidified himself as a member of the Russian music community. According to musicologist Barrie Martyn, in April he brought Nikolai Medtner the pieces performed at the concert and in May he was hoping to stay with him during the summer holiday for further discussions, though this did not happen. His revelation to the world was short lived, as a few months later he was found dead near a stream near Logachyovo, close to a family friend's estate.  He was only 26 years old when he died.  He was buried in Smolensk.

List of known works
Two Mazurkas for piano (1905-7)
I. Allegro in D-flat major
II. Allegretto in G-sharp minor.
Three Sketches for piano (1905–07)
[Originally composed as part of Twelve Sketches Op. 1]
I. Allegro marcato in C major 
II. Allegretto in A minor 
III. Presto tempestoso in C major
Sonata in E-flat minor for piano (1906)
Nocturne for piano (1907)
Etude in G minor for piano (1907)
Allegro patetico
Etude in A-flat major for piano (1907)
Animato assai
Three Preludes for piano (1907)
1. Lento in C-sharp minor; 
2. Con moto in D major; 
3. Adagio in E-flat minor
Canon in B minor for piano (1908)
Prelude in E major for piano (1908)
Prelude in Lydian mode for piano (1908)
Prelude and Fugue in G minor for piano (1909)
Trio for piano, violin and cello (1907–10)
Three Preludes for piano (1907–10)
1. In G minor
2. In F minor
3. In B major
Ten Scottish Songs to poems by Robert Burns (1907–10)
Twelve Sketches Op. 1 for piano (1911)
1. Moderato in C minor  
2. Presto in G minor 
3. Vivace in D major 
4. Lento cantabile in A minor  
5. Allegro in A-flat major 
6. Andante epico in Dorian mode  
7. Adagio teneramente in C-flat major  
8. Molto vivace in G-sharp minor 
9. Largamente in D minor  
10. Con moto in A major 
11. Allegro con spirito in F-sharp minor 
12. Presto assai in C major
Variations in A minor for piano (1911)
Five Preludes for piano (1907–12)
I. Andante in C minor
II. Lento espressivo in F minor
III. Presto in B-flat minor
IV. Animato in B minor
V. Largo in C minor
Piano Sonata No. 1 in F major (1911–12)
Allegro Op. 2 for piano (1912)
Piano Sonata No. 2 in G major (1912)
Four Canon-Preludes for piano (1913)
[A]. Allegro risoluto in C major 
[B]. Vivace in G major 
[C]. Andante sostenuto in E mixolydian 
[D]. Veloce in E-flat minor/G-flat major “Canon a 2 voci per l’aumentazione”

There are other works that are credited yet were left unfinished or destroyed by Stanchinsky due to his brash nature in his composition lessons, and his later desire to create his own musical voice.  Much of what has survived was credited to his colleagues and more importantly Zhilyayev and Taneyev for preventing the mass burning of his works during their lessons with Stanchinsky.

Inspirations
Alexei Stanchinsky is often reviewed as a revolutionary Russian composer, but there are many aspects of his work that can be viewed as a sort of tribute to those musicians that he admired.  His first piano sonatas have a sort of texture that resembles the works of Scriabin and Grieg, and in many other works there is a simplicity to them gathered from folksongs that heavily resemble those of Mussorgsky.  After his years at the conservatory he began to wander away from the composers of the past and push forward to new ideas that were still being hinted at by 19th century composers.

In his second Piano Sonata he began exploring asymmetrical time signatures such as 11/8, and he fully explores the tonality of his works, while relying on harmonic and melodic tension derived from the complete use of octatonic, whole-tone, as well as diatonic and modal collections. He reciprocated these concepts by featuring Russian folk songs as the melodies in his music, quite similar to the works of Stravinsky during the same time frame.  Near his last years, his music had reached a peak of its own, combining what he had learned and creating music that was very polyphonic at its base form.  It is acclaimed that Russian music had suffered a great blow following his death.

Early death
He drowned outside Logachyovo, Russia, but it is not known if he intentionally took his own life. As a child he was often sickly and had to forgo trips to Moscow and other major cities. According to Elena Bai's story, Alexey was supposed to come to her on September 22, 1914. Stanchinsky's mother was against this meeting, did not let Alexei go. According to Vera Glinka, who was visiting (the daughter of Mikhail Glinka's cousin, with whom Alexei was associated with friendly and creative interests), Stanchinsky did not obey and went into the night. As sister Lydia Stanchinskaya wrote, Alexei was found the next day “... dead on the bank of the river 15 miles from Logachev, in wet clothes. According to the mother, the paramedic who arrived at the scene determined death from heart paralysis. " Apparently, Stanchinsky had to wade the river, September was cold, and his body could not stand it (Stanchinsky had a weak heart).

References

External links
 
 Biography at answers.com
 List of works

Composers from the Russian Empire
1888 births
1914 deaths
Deaths by drowning